John Stirling may refer to:
John Stirling (principal) (1654–1727), Scottish minister
John Stirling (Lord Provost) (1677–1736), Scottish merchant
 Jock Stirling (1887–1924), Scottish footballer 
Sir John Lancelot Stirling (1849–1932), Australian politician
John Stirling (police officer), Chief Constable of Great Grimsby, 1900–1930
Sir John Stirling (Scottish politician)  (1893–1975), Scottish soldier and politician
John Stirling (New South Wales politician), Australian politician
John Bertram Stirling (1888–1988), Canadian engineer and businessmen
John Stirling, Linlithgow Pursuivant in the Court of the Lord Lyon, Scotland
John Stirling of Kippendavie (1742-1816), Scottish landowner and father of Jane Stirling

See also
John Sterling (disambiguation)
Sir John Stirling-Maxwell, 10th Baronet (1866–1956), Scottish politician and philanthropist